Clifford Scott Franklin (born August 23, 1964) is an American politician and businessman who has served as the U.S. representative for  from 2021 to 2023. He is a member of the Republican Party.

Early life and career 
Born in Thomaston, Georgia, Franklin was raised in Lakeland, Florida. He earned a Bachelor of Science degree from the United States Naval Academy in 1986 and served in the United States Navy as a Naval Aviator flying the S-3 Viking off of multiple aircraft carriers and routinely deploying overseas. Franklin later earned a Master of Business Administration from Embry–Riddle Aeronautical University and is a graduate of the Armed Forces Staff College.

Career 
Franklin spent 26 years in the Navy, 14 on active duty and 12 in the Naval Reserve, including being mobilized/recalled to active duty with U.S. Central Command after the September 11 attacks. He retired with the rank of Commander.

In 2000, Franklin joined Lanier Upshaw, an insurance agency, and became its chief executive officer. In 2017, he was elected as a city commissioner for the Southeast district of Lakeland, Florida, succeeding longtime incumbent Edie Yates. Because of his run for Congress, Franklin was required to resign his seat on the city commission; he chose to make his resignation effective on January 3, 2021, the day he was sworn into Congress. Franklin was succeeded on the city commission by Don Selvage, a former commissioner who held the seat as an interim appointee from January 4 until the April 6 special election to fill the vacancy.

U.S. House of Representatives

Elections

2020 

In March 2020, Franklin announced his primary bid against freshman congressman Ross Spano, who was facing investigation by federal investigators over financial irregularities. Franklin won the primary, receiving his party’s nomination for the general election, in which he defeated Democratic nominee Alan Cohn.

Committee assignments
Committee on Armed Services
Committee on Oversight and Government Reform

Caucus memberships
Republican Study Committee

Electoral history

Personal Life 

Franklin is a Presbyterian.

References

External links
Representative Scott Franklin official U.S. House website
Scott Franklin for Congress

|-

|-

 -->

1964 births
Living people
Embry–Riddle Aeronautical University alumni
People from Lakeland, Florida
American Presbyterians
Presbyterians from Florida
Republican Party members of the United States House of Representatives from Florida
United States Naval Academy alumni
United States Naval Aviators
21st-century American politicians
United States Navy reservists